Ina'am Qaddoura Al-Mufti (February 26, 1929 – 6 November 2018) was the first Jordanian woman to hold a governmental position.

Biography 
Qaddoura established the Ministry of Social Development, Noor Al-Hussein Foundation, Women Issues Organization, Jubilee School of Amman, Children's Trust, Union of Jordanian Women, and National Union for Jordanian Business Women. She was also a part of UNESCO, spoke on several radio shows spreading awareness, and was a part of writing a book used in all schools in the kingdom.

Qaddoura was a member of the Senate, the Upper House of the National Assembly of Jordan.

Honorary office and memberships 
Honorary office and memberships:
 Member of several universities like the University of Applied Sciences, Mutah University, Yarmouk University, Faculty of Princess Tharwat,
 A member of the King Hussein Foundation and the Noor Al Hussein Foundation and its projects,
 A member of the International Council of the Federation of World Colleges,
 A member of the Arab Council for Childhood and Development,
 A member of the Steering Committee (adult education) \ UNESCO,
 A member of the Senate,
 Member of the Board of Education in the Ministry of Education,
 President of the Alumni Club American University in Cairo \ Amman,
 Member of the Arab Thought Forum,
 Member of the Committee on Education and Culture and the media,
 A member of the committee on health, environment and social development,
 A member of the Foreign Affairs Committee

References

 https://web.archive.org/web/20121027032137/http://www.whoisshe-women.jo/expert-profile/inaam-asad-qaddura-al-mufti

External links
 Prime Ministry of Jordan website

1929 births
2018 deaths
Members of the Senate of Jordan
Jordanian diplomats
Government ministers of Jordan
Social affairs ministers of Jordan
UNESCO officials
Academic staff of Yarmouk University
Academic staff of Mutah University
Academic staff of the Applied Science Private University
The American University in Cairo alumni
Women government ministers of Jordan
20th-century women politicians
Jordanian officials of the United Nations